Geoffrey "Geoff" Smith (born ) is an English former rugby union and professional rugby league footballer who played in the 1950s and 1960s.

Background
Geoff Smith was born in Wakefield, West Riding of Yorkshire, England.

Playing career

International honours
Geoff Smith won caps for Great Britain while at York in 1963 against Australia, and in 1964 against France (2 matches).

County honours
Geoff Smith won cap(s) for Yorkshire while at York.

County Cup Final appearances
Geoff Smith played left-, i.e. number 4, in York's 8-15 defeat by Huddersfield in the 1957 Yorkshire County Cup Final during the 1957–58 season at Headingley Rugby Stadium, Leeds on Saturday 19 October 1957.

References

External links
!Great Britain Statistics at englandrl.co.uk (statistics currently missing due to not having appeared for both Great Britain, and England)

1930s births
Living people
English rugby league players
English rugby union players
Great Britain national rugby league team players
Rugby league centres
Rugby league wingers
Rugby league players from Wakefield
Rugby union players from Wakefield
Year of birth missing (living people)
York Wasps players
Yorkshire rugby league team players